We Are Dad is a 2005 documentary film chronicling the story of two male pediatric AIDS nurses who have taken in a number of HIV positive infants as their foster parents.  The film outlines the couple's struggle to provide a stable and loving home to their children.  When one child, who tested HIV-positive at birth, is discovered to be HIV negative, the state of Florida determined that the child should be adopted, but refused to allow his foster parents, a gay couple, to adopt him.  The fight over this decision thrust this family into the center of the debate over gay adoption.

External links
Official Site

2005 documentary films
LGBT adoption
Documentary films about HIV/AIDS
2005 films
Films shot in Florida
LGBT in Florida
Documentary films about adoption
American LGBT-related films
2005 LGBT-related films
HIV/AIDS in American films
2000s American films